Koipsi is an island and a village in Jõelähtme Parish, Harju County in northern Estonia. If in 2010 it had a population of 1 (as of 1 January 2010), today it's uninhabited.

References

Estonian islands in the Baltic
Villages in Harju County